James Arnold Watson (8 November 1936 – 28 April 2015) was an English writer. The best known of his twelve children's novels is Talking in Whispers—winner of The Other Award from the Children's Rights Workshop, runner-up for the 1984 Carnegie Medal, and, in its German translation, winner of the 1987 Buxtehude Bull award. Two others are Ticket to Prague  and The Bull Leapers. He was a lecturer in media and communication studies and he has written three books in the field.

Biography

Watson was born in Darwen, Lancashire, England.

His book The Noisy Ducks of Buxtehude is a dual-language text (English/German)aimed at very young readers.

A 1989 profile in the U.K. children's books magazine Books for Keeps noted that a theme of Watson's work was "a universal fight for human rights", and that three of his novels, "adventure thrillers set amid the Spanish Civil War (The Freedom Tree), the Chile of the ‘disappeared’ (Talking in Whispers), and a contemporary Britain where the Establishment closes ranks over nuclear secrecy (Where Nobody Sees)" had been praised "for their exciting action, their passion and their challenge to debate."  The Carnegie Medal panel described Talking in Whispers as covering "the difficult theme of oppression in Chile, as seen through the eyes of three teenagers, with great honesty and sincerity."

He wrote two plays for senior schools and four plays for radio.  He published the novel Fair Game – Steps of the Odessa in 2008 and "Pigs Might Fly", an original e-reader (Kindle), in 2013.

He died on 28 April 2015.

Works

Fiction 
Sign of the Swallow
The Bull Leapers
Legion of The White Tiger
The Freedom Tree
Talking in Whispers
Where Nobody Sees
No Surrender
Ticket to Prague
Justice of the Dagger
The Ghosts of Izieu
"Make Your Move" and Other Stories 
Fair Game – Steps of the Odessa
" Pigs Might Fly"

Dramas 
Banned! Tom Paine, This Was Your Life 
Gotcha!*Wars-R-Us.comRobin Hood: the Play, or How Prince John Pitted His Wits Against the Outlaws of Sherwood ForestThe Noisy Ducks of BuxtehudeFair Game – Steps of the Odessa''
" Pigs Might Fly"

Educational 
"What is Communication Studies?"
"The Dictionary of Media & Communication Studies" (with Anne Hill)
"Media Communication: An Introduction to Theory & Process"

See also

References

External links
 

1936 births
2015 deaths
British children's writers
People from Darwen